UrwaTul Wusqua Hussain, better known by her stage name Urwa Hocane (born 2 July 1991) is a Pakistani actress, model and media personality. She made her acting debut with Khushboo Ka Ghar as Rukhsana in 2012. Hocane is best known for portraying Meera in Udaari which earned her Hum Awards for Best On-screen Couple shared with Farhan Saeed and nomination in Hum Awards for Best Actress Popular. She played a role of Guddi in Momina Duraid's Mushk which earned her Lux Style Award for Best Actress Critics nomination.

She made her film debut with Nabeel Qureshi's romantic comedy Na Maloom Afraad and later appeared in Punjab Nahi Jaungi directed by Nadeem Baig. In 2022, she is all set to make her debut as a producer with romantic drama Tich Button.

Early life and career
Hocane was born in Karachi, but she grew up in Islamabad where she completed her education from Bahria College, Islamabad. She is the sister of another television actress Mawra Hocane. As a teenager, she performed as a theatre artist before she started working as a VJ for ARY Musik. As a sign of filial devotion to her younger sibling Mawra, when Urwa started her career she chose to use the name Hocane and over time, it stuck.

Career
Hocane made her acting debut with leading role in the 2012 romantic drama Meri Ladli alongside Ahsan Khan and Sajal Ali. She later appeared in serials such as Kahi Un Kahi, and Madiha Maliha. Her portrayal of a girl subjected to family pressures and a forced wedding in Marasim.

She made her film debut in the 2014 romantic comedy Na Maloom Afraad opposite Fahad Mustafa, Mohsin Abbas Haider and Javed Sheikh. The film received generally positive reviews, and she was praised for her performance. She was offered Ekta Kapoor's Bollywood film Azhar alongside Emran Hashmi, which she refused saying, she was not going to do kissing and bold scenes on screen.

In January 2019, Hocane announced her first project as a producer, a romantic film with husband Farhan Saeed titled Tich Button. They are producing the film together. In March Hocane posted picture from her shooting spell of Tich Button at Nankana Sahib, on her Instagram account.

In June 2019, she launched her clothing line in collaboration with her sister Mawra Hocane.

In 2020, she starred in the television series Mushk opposite Imran Ashraf.

Personal life
Hocane married Farhan Saeed on December 16, 2016 at Lahore, Pakistan.

There have been rumours of their separation. However, Urwa's father has dismissed such news.

Filmography

Films

Television

Awards and nominations

References

External links
 
 

Living people
Pakistani female models
Pakistani television actresses
Actresses from Karachi
People from Islamabad
Punjabi people
Pakistani film actresses
21st-century Pakistani actresses
VJs (media personalities)
Actresses in Urdu cinema
1991 births